Your Best Friend may refer to:

 Your Best Friend (film), a 1922 American silent drama film
 "Your Best Friend" (song), a 2011 song by Mai Kuraki
 "Your Best Friend", a track from the soundtrack of the 2015 video game Undertale by Toby Fox